Gaby Charroux (born 1942) is a French politician.

Early life
Gaby Charroux was born on 25 June 1942 in Algiers, French Algeria.

Career
Charroux was a schoolteacher.

Charroux is a member of the French Communist Party. He served as Michel Vaxès's parliamentary assistant. He served as a member of the National Assembly from 2012 to 2017, representing Bouches-du-Rhône's 13th constituency. In May 2016, he co-sponsored a bill to cap the salaries of top executives in private corporations.

Charroux also serves as the mayor of Martigues. In July 2016, he tried to expel Roma people, in vain.

References

Living people
People from Algiers
People from Martigues
French Communist Party members
Mayors of places in Provence-Alpes-Côte d'Azur
1942 births
Deputies of the 14th National Assembly of the French Fifth Republic